Nexon is a commune in the Haute-Vienne department in the Nouvelle-Aquitaine region in west-central France. Nexon station has rail connections to Bordeaux, Périgueux, Brive-la-Gaillarde and Limoges.

Inhabitants are known as Nexonnais in French.

See also
 Communes of the Haute-Vienne department

References

Communes of Haute-Vienne
Limousin